"Lost in the Supermarket" is a 1979 song by the Clash.  Written by Joe Strummer and Mick Jones and produced by Guy Stevens, it is credited to the Strummer/Jones songwriting partnership. It was released on their third studio album London Calling. It is the eighth song on the track listing. Although it features Jones on lead vocals, the song was written by Strummer. The supermarket in question was the International, located at 471–473 Kings Road, beneath the World's End Estate. Strummer lived at 31 Whistler Walk at the time with his girlfriend Gaby Salter, her two younger brothers and her mother. The song appears in the Apple TV+ show Loot.

Music and lyrics
"Lost in the Supermarket" is described as a post-punk, pop, R&B, and soul song.

Strummer first wrote the lyrics of the chorus on the reverse of an Ernie Ball Custom Gauge Strings paper envelope. The song's lyrics describe someone struggling to deal with an increasingly commercialised world and rampant consumerism.  The song opens with Strummer's autobiographical memories of his parents' home in suburban Warlingham, with a hedge "over which I never could see."  With lines such as "I came in here for that special offer – guaranteed personality", the protagonist bemoans the depersonalisation of the world around him. The song speaks of numbness from suburban alienation and the feelings of disillusionment that come through youth in modern society.

In the Making of 'London Calling': The Last Testament DVD, released with the 25th anniversary edition of London Calling in 2004, Strummer said he wrote the lyrics imagining Jones' life growing up in a basement with his mother and grandmother.

Topper Headon used a tom-tom drum on the song instead of a snare drum after seeing Taj Mahal's drummer doing the same thing in a concert the night before the recording.

Covers
Ben Folds covered the song for the soundtrack of the film Over the Hedge.
The Afghan Whigs covered the song for the 1999 compilation album Burning London: The Clash Tribute.

Personnel
Mick Jones – lead guitar, lead vocals
Joe Strummer – rhythm guitar, backing vocals
Paul Simonon – bass guitar
Topper Headon – drums

Notes

References

 
 
 
 
 
 

1979 songs
The Clash songs
British rock songs
Songs written by Mick Jones (The Clash)
Songs written by Joe Strummer
Song recordings produced by Guy Stevens
Songs about consumerism